Institutionalized Volume 2 is Ras Kass' mixtape, commercially released by Babygrande Records.

Track listing

Bonus tracks

Samples
John Is Real
"Im A Hustla" by Cassidy
B.I.B.L.E.
"He's Working It Out for You" by Shirley Caesar
Ups & Downs
"(I Just) Died in Your Arms" by Cutting Crew
"I Need Love" by LL Cool J

References

Babygrande Records albums
Ras Kass albums
2008 albums